Justicia angustifolia is a plant native to the Atlantic Forest vegetation of Brazil.

References

polita
Endemic flora of Brazil
Flora of the Atlantic Forest